Menominee is a city in the Upper Peninsula of the U.S. state of Michigan.  The population was 8,599 at the 2010 census.  It is the county seat of Menominee County. Menominee is the fourth-largest city in the Upper Peninsula, behind Marquette, Sault Ste. Marie, and Escanaba. Menominee Township is located to the north of the city, but is politically autonomous.

Menominee is part of the Marinette, WI–MI Micropolitan Statistical Area.

History
In historic times, this area was the traditional territory of the Menominee Indian Tribe. The town of Menominee was named after their English name which roughly translates as "wild rice," a nickname given to them by their Ojibwe neighbours based on their cultivation of wild rice as a staple food. In their own language, they are known as Mamaceqtaw which means simply "the people", and the town of Menominee is known as Menīkāneh, which means "at the good village". They were removed to west of the Mississippi River and now have a reservation along the Wolf River in North Central Wisconsin after ceding their territory to the United States in the 1836 Treaty of the Cedars.

Menominee gained prominence in the 19th century as a lumber town; in its heyday, it produced more lumber than any other city in the United States of America. During this time of prosperity, the Menominee Opera House was built. It is being restored. In the 1910s a cycle car, the "Dudly Bug", was manufactured in Menominee. In the waning years of lumber production, local business interests, interested in diversifying Menominee's manufacturing base, attracted inventor Marshall Burns Lloyd and his Minneapolis company Lloyd Manufacturing, which made wicker baby buggies. In 1917 Lloyd invented an automated process for weaving wicker and manufactured it as the Lloyd Loom. This machine process is still in use today. In the 21st century, the economy of Menominee is based on manufacturing (paper products, wicker lawn furniture, and auto supplies) and tourism.

In 1940, during the "Vote for Gracie" publicity stunt in which comedian Gracie Allen ran for president, she was nominated for mayor of Menominee, but was disqualified because she was not a resident of the city.

Sports
The Menominee Maroons won the state high school championship in its division for basketball in 1967 and football in 1998, 2006 and 2007. In the 2006 season the Maroons finished unbeaten and only allowed 38 points scored against them but their offense scored 513 point in that entire season . They beat the former Wisconsin and Minnesota Division One state champions. Menominee shares a historic high school football rivalry with neighbor Marinette, Wisconsin. The two have conducted the third-longest rivalry in the nation.

Menominee, like most good sized towns embraced the newly emerging 19th century sport of football.  A local group took the name of North End Athletic Club and under Manager McPhaul, were the visiting opponent for the newly formed Green Bay team sponsored by the Indian Packing Co. led by the eventual legend Captain Curly Lambeau. The Indian Co. Packers of Green Bay defeated the N.E.A.C. Colts of Menominee 53–0 at Hagemeister Field.

Geography

It is the southernmost city and location in Michigan's Upper Peninsula.

Menominee has a cairn marking the halfway point between the North Pole and the Equator. This is slightly north of the 45th parallel north, due to the flattening of the earth at the poles. This is one of six Michigan sites and 29 places in the U.S.A. where such signs are known to exist.

Menominee, Michigan, is also the site of the Menominee Crack, an unusual geological feature that formed spontaneously in 2010.

Twin city with Marinette, Wisconsin
Menominee and Marinette, Wisconsin are sometimes described as "twin cities".

Menominee shares a hospital, community foundation, newspaper and chamber of commerce with Marinette. Numerous city groups work together to benefit the entire two-city, two-county and two-state community.

Climate
This climatic region is typified by large seasonal temperature differences, with warm to hot (and often humid) summers and cold (sometimes severely cold) winters.  According to the Köppen Climate Classification system, Menominee has a humid continental climate, abbreviated "Dfb" on climate maps.

Demographics

2010 census
As of the census of 2010, there were 8,599 people, 3,987 households, and 2,311 families living in the city. The racial makeup of the city was 96.7% White, 0.4% African American, 0.9% Native American, 0.5% Asian, 0.2% from other races, and 1.2% from two or more races. Hispanic or Latino of any race were 1.4% of the population.

There were 3,987 households, of which 26.3% had children under the age of 18 living with them, 40.0% were married couples living together, 12.6% had a female householder with no spouse present, 5.4% had a male householder with no spouse present, and 42.0% were non-families. 37.1% of all households were made up of individuals, and 14.5% had someone living alone who was 65 years of age or older. The average household size was 2.13 and the average family size was 2.74.

The median age in the city was 44 years. 21.8% of residents were under the age of 18; 7% were between the ages of 18 and 24; 22.7% were from 25 to 44; 30.3% were from 45 to 64; and 18.3% were 65 years of age or older. The gender makeup of the city was 48.7% male and 51.3% female.

2000 census
As of the census of 2000, there were 9,131 people, 4,063 households, and 2,441 families living in the city. The racial makeup of the city was 97.35% White, 0.14% African American, 0.82% Native American, 0.32% Asian, 0.27% from other races, and 1.10% from two or more races. Hispanic or Latino of any race were 1.12% of the population. 31.6% were of German, 9.3% French, 8.7% Swedish, 8.7% Polish, 7.2% Irish and 6.7% French Canadian ancestry according to Census 2000.

There were 4,063 households, out of which 27.9% had children under the age of 18 living with them, 43.6% were married couples living together, 12.4% had a female householder with no husband present, and 39.9% were non-families. 35.3% of all households were made up of individuals, and 15.0% had someone living alone who was 65 years of age or older.  The average household size was 2.22 and the average family size was 2.86.

In the city, the population was spread out, with 23.9% under the age of 18, 9.4% from 18 to 24, 25.8% from 25 to 44, 22.8% from 45 to 64, and 18.2% who were 65 years of age or older.  The median age was 39 years. For every 100 females, there were 92.8 males.  For every 100 females age 18 and over, there were 90.4 males.

The median income for a household in the city was $30,523, and the median income for a family was $38,867. Males had a median income of $32,850 versus $22,145 for females. The per capita income for the city was $17,500.  About 9.9% of families and 13.3% of the population were below the poverty line, including 18.2% of those under age 18 and 11.9% of those age 65 or over.

Historic downtown and marina

Much of Menominee's L-shaped downtown runs along the shores of the bay of Green Bay and includes the Great Lakes Memorial Marina and park. Many of the downtown buildings, built at the end of the 19th century or the beginning of the 20th, have been restored. They now provide space for several upscale restaurants, gift shops, beauty salons and day spas, antiques shops, galleries and a variety of essential services. The Menominee Bandshell is a focal point for concerts, an art show, a car show and a four-day community festival.

Economy
The greater Menominee area is home to a variety of industries, including shipbuilding, auto parts, chemicals, helicopter design and construction, airplane components, health care, and paper making. In good financial times, some local companies have reported a shortage of skilled workers.

The types of jobs available locally include assemblers, assembly coordinators, building and grounds technicians, custodians, cutting machine operators, electricians, fabrication operators, fixture technicians, journeyman toolmakers, machinists, maintenance mechanics, material handlers, metal fabricators, forklift drivers, paint coordinators, powder coating specialists, research-and-development technicians, quality control technicians, sewing and weaving machine operators, shipping/loading/receiving attendants, spinning and rewind machine operators, cutters, stamping operators, welders, and welding coordinators.

Menominee is also the headquarters and manufacturing plant of Enstrom Helicopter Corporation, a US helicopter manufacturer. Enstrom manufactures its F-28F & F-280FX piston helicopters as well as its 480 B turbine helicopter in Menominee.

Government
Since January 2012, the mayor of Menominee has been Jean Stegeman.

Since November 2021, the city manager has been Brett J Botbyl .

Transportation

Ground transportation
Several highways connect through the Menominee area:
  connects with Escanaba and Marquette to the north and Marinette, Wisconsin and Green Bay, Wisconsin to the south.
  runs northeast to provide a more direct route to Escanaba along the shore of Lake Michigan's Green Bay.
  starts just across the state line in Marinette and travels westerly.
  starts just across the state line in Marinette and travels northerly then westerly.

Indian Trails bus lines operates daily intercity bus service between Hancock and Milwaukee, Wisconsin, with a stop in Menominee.

Airport
Menominee is serviced by the Menominee-Marinette Twin County Airport (KMNM)

Car ferries
Ann Arbor Railroad ran cross-Lake Michigan car ferries from Betsie Lake, Elberta, Michigan, to Menominee starting in 1894, and also connected railcar freight with the Wisconsin & Michigan Railway until 1938 or some time after. In January 1970 the Interstate Commerce Commission authorized the Ann Arbor Railroad to abandon this service. The location of the Ann Arbor carferry slip in Lighthouse Ann Arbor Park has been converted to a boat launch.

Railroad

Currently the railroad lines serving the twin cites only offer freight service as provided by the Escanaba and Lake Superior Railroad.

The Milwaukee Road railroad began passenger service to Menominee in 1903. That year they constructed a rail passenger depot, running frequent trips between Menominee and Ellis Junction (now Crivitz). They shared the station tracks with the Wisconsin & Michigan Railway. The passenger ridership dropped significantly by 1920 causing the Milwaukee Road to abandon service to the Menominee station in May 1927 and thereafter closed the station. The Wisconsin and Michigan Railroad continued their freight service to 1938.

The Chicago and Northwestern Railroad also had a freight and passenger station on 7th Street in town. Passenger service to the C&NW station ended on July 16, 1969.

Recreation
Menominee's waterfront is the setting for public events in the summer, including a city-sponsored festival. The Marinette Menominee Area Chamber of Commerce coordinates a concert series held on Thursdays from late June to mid-August. The Cabela Master Walleye Circuit brought hundreds of fishermen and women to the area for tournaments in 2005, 2008 and 2009.

Notable people

 James Bonk, longtime chemistry professor, Duke University
 Audrey Cleary, North Dakota state legislator
 John O. Henes, businessman and philanthropist
 Kathleen Kirkham, silent-film actress 
 Mitchell Leisen, Hollywood director, art director and costumer designer
 Kent T. Lundgren, pharmacist and Michigan state senator
 Dave Mason, NFL player
 Richard P. Matty, Wisconsin State Assemblyman
 John McLean, Olympic silver medal winner
 Alvin H. Nielsen, molecular spectroscopist
 Harald Herborg Nielsen, physicist
 William Nolde, last American soldier killed in Vietnam
 Fred Stephenson Norcross, University of Michigan football captain, coach Oregon State University
 Doris Packer, actress who played Mrs. Rayburn, Theodore Cleaver's principal in the television series Leave It to Beaver
 Bill Rademacher, NFL player, Super Bowl III champion
 Mitzi Shore, owner of The Comedy Store in Los Angeles 
 Samuel M. Stephenson, member of United States House of Representatives from Michigan
 Bart Stupak, member of US House of Representatives from Michigan
 Robyn Leigh Tanguay, molecular toxicologist, Oregon State University
 Leonard J. Umnus, college football player and coach

See also
 Interstate Bridge (Marinette, Wisconsin – Menominee, Michigan)

References

Further reading

External links

 Official City of Menominee website
 Menominee's Historic Waterfront Downtown
 Menominee Public Library
 Menominee Public Schools
 Marinette Menominee Area Chamber of Commerce

Cities in Menominee County, Michigan
County seats in Michigan
Michigan populated places on Lake Michigan
Marinette micropolitan area